Woodend is situated between the Duddon Valley and the village of Ulpha and the valley of Eskdale,  high up on Birker Fell, approximately 950 feet above sea level. It is claimed to have been an early Quaker settlement. With views towards Scafell Pike, England's highest mountain, it is very close to Devoke Water, one of the Lake District tarns.

Villages in Cumbria
Borough of Copeland